Full Tilt may refer to:

 Full Tilt: Ireland to India with a Bicycle, a 1965 travel book by Dervla Murphy
 Full Tilt, a 2003 novel by Janet Evanovich
 Full Tilt (novel), a 2004 young adult novel by Neal Shusterman
 Full Tilt, alternate title for the 1937 film Knights for a Day
 Full Tilt Poker, an online cardroom

See also 
 Full Tilt! Pinball, a 1995 video game